Satu Suro (Javanese:) is the first day of the Javanese calendar year in the month of Suro (also transcribed "Sura"), corresponding with the first Islamic month of Muharram. It is mainly celebrated in Java, Indonesia, and by Javanese people living elsewhere.

Satu Suro has numerous associations in Javanese folk tales and superstitions in Java that vary considerably through regional variation in cultural practices. The prevalent theme of most Satu Suro superstitions is the danger of going out from home, similar to the Balinese holiday of silence, Nyepi.

An Indonesian film, Malam Satu Suro, explores the dangers and superstitions about leaving home on the night of Satu Suro.

Rituals During the Eve of Satu Suro
The Javanese day begins at the sunset of the previous day, not at midnight; as such, considerable emphasis is placed on the eve of the  first day of the month of Suro.

Satu Suro rituals include:
Meditation, a common practice in the Kejawèn religion. The objective is to examine what has been done in the past year and to prepare what will be done in the future. The two main types of Satu Suro meditation include:
Tapa Bisu: meditation  in silence;
Tapa Kungkum: meditation while submerged underwater.
Tirakatan and tuguran: Staying up all night engaged in self-reflection and prayer, often accompanied by wayang kulit (shadow puppetry). Many people also visit graves and holy sites during tirakatan.
Ruwatan: rituals to spiritually cleanse an area, such as a house or building, from evil spirits and calamity.
Kirab Malam Satu Suro: in the city of Surakarta (Solo), a traditional cleansing ritual of the royal pusaka (heirloom) items held at the Palace of Surakarta.

See also
Islamic calendar

Notes

Further reading
Soebardi. Calendrical traditions in Indonesia Madjalah IIlmu-ilmu Satsra Indonesia, 1965 no.3.

External links
Javanese Calendar and Its Significance to Mystical Life, by Suryo S. Negoro
Kirab Malam Satu Suro Ritual | Dukun Indonesia

Indonesian folklore
Javanese culture